Grevillea stenomera, commonly known as lace net grevillea, is a species of flowering plant in the family Proteaceae and is endemic to near-coastal areas in the west of Western Australia. It is a rounded, glaucous shrub with pinnatisect leaves with 5 to 15 linear lobes, and pinkish and greenish-yellow flowers with a greenish style.

Description
The edges of the leaflets are rolled under concealing the lower surface apart from the midrib.

Taxonomy
Grevillea stenomera was first formally described in 1864 by botanist Ferdinand von Mueller in his Fragmenta Phytographiae Australiae from specimens collected near the Murchison River by Augustus Oldfield. The specific epithet (stenomera) means "narrow leaflets".

Distribution and habitat
Lace net grevillea is usually found in coastal scrub communities growing in sandy soils over or near limestone. The range of the plant extends from around Tamala Station, just south of Shark Bay, in the north down to around Kalbarri in the south and is found fairly close to the coast in the Geraldton Sandplains and Yalgoo bioregions of western Western Australia.

Conservation status
Grevillea stenomera is listed as "Priority Two" by the Western Australian Government Department of Biodiversity, Conservation and Attractions, meaning that it is poorly known and from only one or a few locations.

Use in horticulture
The Grevillea cultivar sold by plant nurseries as "Grevillea stenomera prostrate red" is thought to be a hybrid of Grevillea pinaster.

See also
List of Grevillea species

References

stenomera
Endemic flora of Western Australia
Eudicots of Western Australia
Proteales of Australia
Taxa named by Ferdinand von Mueller
Plants described in 1864